Home Normal is a Tokyo based record label founded in December 2008 and launched in March 2009.  The label was curated by Ian Hawgood, co-run with Ben Jones, with design assistance from Jeremy Bible and Christian Roth until 2016. 
Based exclusively in Tokyo, Home Normal is on hiatus until re-opening at the end of 2020 when it will be run by a group of friends based in Japan.

The label specializes in minimal music, with their releases branching between post-classical, experimental ambient, drone and electronica. They've released over 100 albums to date.

Artists 
The following are artists with releases on Home Normal:

 Asuna
 bvdub
 Stefano Guzzetti
 Tobias Hellkvist
 Library Tapes
 Gareth Davis
 Ken Ikeda
 David Toop
 Taishi Kamiya
 Machinefabriek
 Federico Durand
 James Murray
 Giulio Aldinucci
 Hotel Neon
 Will Bolton
 Mere
 M. Ostermeier
 Ghost And Tape
 Greg Davis
 Stijn Hüwels
 Félicia Atkinson
 Pleq
 Hakobune
 Chihei Hatakeyama

Sub-Labels 
Besides the main catalog, Home Normal has a number of sub-labels that it manages. These include:

 Folk Reels
 Nomadic Kids Republic
 Koen Music
 Tokyo Droning
 Sleep Loops
 Stella Recordings
 Minimal Maps
 Constellations x Artefacts

See also
 List of record labels
 List of independent record labels
 List of electronic music record labels

References

External links
 Official website
 Home Normal on Discogs
 Drifting, Almost Falling - An interview with Ian Hawgood from Home Normal

Japanese record labels
Record labels established in 2008
Japanese independent record labels
Classical music record labels
Ambient music record labels
Experimental music record labels
Electronic music record labels